is the second single released by Mr. Children on December 1, 1992.

Overview
The single reached #56 on the Oricon Japanese charts selling 60,790 copies. The single was released on the same day as the group's second album, Kind of Love, which also included the single in it.  was included as a live recording on the group's live album, 1/42, released on September 8, 1999 and Mr. Children 1992–1995, which was released on July 11, 2001. The b-side track, was included on the group's compilation album B-Side, released on May 10, 2007.

Over the years the title track, has become a fan favorite in polls as a song desired to be played at weddings and as a song used to charm women.  has also been popular amongst other recording artists with Ryuichi Kawamura, lead singer of Luna Sea, covering the song on the anniversary edition of his album Evergreen released on December 5, 2007.

Track listing

Personnel 
 Kazutoshi Sakurai – vocals, guitar
 Kenichi Tahara – guitar
 Keisuke Nakagawa – bass
 Hideya Suzuki – drums

Production 
 Producer – Kobayashi Takeshi
 Arrangement - Mr. Children and Takeshi Kobayashi

References 

1992 singles
Mr. Children songs
Songs written by Kazutoshi Sakurai
1992 songs
Toy's Factory singles
Song recordings produced by Takeshi Kobayashi